Hypselodoris godeffroyana is a species of sea slug, a dorid nudibranch, a marine gastropod mollusk in the family Chromodorididae.

Distribution
This species was described from Huaheine, French Polynesia,  It occurs in numerous locations in the tropical Western Pacific Ocean.

References

Chromodorididae
Gastropods described in 1877